Black Narcissus is an album by the American saxophonist Joe Henderson, recorded in 1974, 1975 & 1976, and released in 1977 on  Milestone, Henderson's last to be released on the label. The musicians included pianist Joachim Kuhn, bassist Jean-Francois Jenny-Clark, and drummers Jack DeJohnette and Daniel Humair.

Track listing
"Black Narcissus" – 5:09
"Hindsight and Forethought" – 2:41
"Power to the People" – 12:26
"Amoeba" – 5:40
"Good Morning Heartache" – 6:57
"The Other Side of Right" – 7:18

Personnel
Joe Henderson – tenor sax
Joachim Kühn – piano (1-3, 5-6)
Patrick Gleeson – synthesizer (1-3, 5)
David Friesen (5), Jean-François Jenny-Clark (1-3, 6) – bass
Daniel Humair (1-3, 6), Jack DeJohnette (4-5) – drums
Bill Summers – congas, percussion

References

Milestone Records albums
Joe Henderson albums
1977 albums